Gyirong (Wyl. skyid grong) is a Tibetan place name also transliterated Kyirong or Gyrong.  To Lhasa Newar trans-Himalayan traders it was Kerung, thence Kirong, Kirang etc. 

It may refer to:

Gyirong County, county in Tibet near the border of Nepal
Gyirong Town, a township in Tibet near the border of Nepal
Kyirong language, a Tibetic language
Zongga, the seat of Gyirong county, sometimes called Gyirong Town
A pass north of Zongga used between Nepal and Lhasa before the Friendship Highway was built